Chicoreus brunneus, common name the adusta murex, is a species of predatory sea snail, a marine gastropod mollusk in the family Muricidae, the murex snails.

Subspecies and formae
 Chicoreus (Triplex) brunneus flavicunda (f) (Perry, G., 1810) 
 Chicoreus (Triplex) brunneus huttoniae (f) Wright, B., 1878

Description
The adult shell size of this species varies between 25 mm and 115 mm in length.

Distribution
This sea snail is found widely spread in the Indo-West Pacific, and occurs from east Africa to Polynesia, southern Japan, New South Wales and New Caledonia, Australia.

References

External links
 
 

Muricidae
Taxa named by Johann Heinrich Friedrich Link
Gastropods described in 1807